Joseph Charles Marin (1749, in Paris – 18 September 1834, in Paris) was a French sculptor

Life
He was a student of Claude Michel and made several attempts to win the Grand Prix de Sculpture before the French Revolution, only winning it in 1801 with the bas-relief Caius Gracchus leaving his wife Licinia.

Michel was a strong influence on Marin's early style, which was light, elegant and gracious. He later adopted more austere subjects and style closer to the canons of neo-classicism then in force. In 1813 he became a professor at the École nationale supérieure des beaux-arts de Lyon on the death of his former teacher Joseph Chinard, the post's previous holder.

Bibliography
Patrice Bellanger, Joseph-Charles Marin, Sculpteur, Paris, 1992, Galerie Patrice Bellanger éditeur,, 88 pages. Catalogue of the 1992 exhibition, 27 works.
Emmanuel Schwartz, Les Sculptures de l'École des Beaux-Arts de Paris. Histoire, doctrines, catalogue, École nationale supérieure des Beaux-Arts, Paris, 2003, p. 141

External links
 

1749 births
1834 deaths
18th-century French sculptors
French male sculptors
19th-century French sculptors
Neoclassical sculptors
Artists from Paris
19th-century French male artists
18th-century French male artists